Streptomyces avermitilis is a species of bacteria in the genus Streptomyces. This bacterium was discovered by Satoshi Ōmura in Shizuoka Prefecture, Japan.

The first complete genome sequence of S. avermitilis was completed in 2003. The genome consists of a single chromosome with a linear structure, unlike most bacterial genomes, which exist in the form of circular chromosomes.

Avermectins are industrially derived from the fermentation products of S. avermitilis. Avermectin itself was discovered by the Satoshi Ōmura group and first disclosed in Burg et al. 1979. One of the most widely employed drugs against nematode and arthropod infestations is the avermectin derivative ivermectin, as well as abamectin, a widely used insecticide and antihelmintic.

See also 
 List of Streptomyces species

References

External links 

Type strain of Streptomyces avermitilis at BacDive -  the Bacterial Diversity Metadatabase

avermitilis
Bacteria described in 2002